Choice in eCommerce - Initiative for Choice and Innovation in Online-Trade - is an initiative of online retailers throughout Europe that works for unrestricted trade and innovation in Europe. Spokesman for the initiative is Oliver Prothmann, founder of the Multi-Channel tool chartixx.

History
Choice in eCommerce was founded on May 8, 2013 by several online retailers in Berlin, Germany. The cause was, in the view of the initiative, sales bans and online restrictions by individual manufacturers. The dealers felt cut off from their main sales channel and thus deprived them the opportunity to use online platforms like Amazon, eBay or Rakuten in a competitive market for the benefit of their customers. Sales of all products and services traded online in Europe in 2012 counted 311.6 billion Euros. Through online trading in Europe is estimated that up to two million jobs were created.
The initiative later received support from other industry stakeholders including German BVOH (Bundesverband Onlinehandel) and CCIA (Computer and Communications Industry Association).

In the summer of 2013 Choice started a petition calling for free and fair trade. On December 17, 2013 Oliver Prothmann handed the petition containing 14,341 signatures of online retailers from across Europe to Olli Rehn, Vice-President of the European Commission. The petition calls for manufacturers and brand owners to refrain from trade restrictions or prohibitions for online retailers.

References

External links

Economy of Europe
Law of Germany
E-commerce in Germany